Pristionchus borbonicus is a species of free-living nematodes (roundworms) in the family Diplogastridae. The species was described from Réunion Island, and is notable for developing one of five different mouth forms depending on available food sources. Pristionchus borbonicus and related species have symbiotic relationships with  fig plants and their pollinator wasps.

References 

Rhabditida
Nematodes described in 2016
Invertebrates of Réunion